The Dashuigou Formation is a geological formation in Inner Mongolia, north China, whose strata date back to the Early Cretaceous period.

Dinosaur remains are among the fossils that have been recovered from the formation.

Vertebrate paleofauna
 Probactrosaurus alashanicus - "Fragmentary skull." (probably synonymous with P. gobiensis)
 Probactrosaurus gobiensis - "Skull and skeleton."

See also

 List of dinosaur-bearing rock formations

References

Geologic formations of China
Lower Cretaceous Series of Asia
Albian Stage